Colin Maurice Gale (31 August 1932 – 27 October 2008) was a Welsh professional footballer who made over 200 appearances in The Football League between 1950 and 1961.

Career

A centre half, Gale began his career with Cardiff City in 1950 but was forced to wait until January 1954 before making his debut for the club in a 3–0 win over Manchester City as a right back. Unable to hold down a regular first team spot, Gale made the last of his 13 appearances in all competitions for the club during a 9–1 defeat to Wolverhampton Wanderers in September 1955 before leaving to join Third Division South side Northampton Town in March 1956, as part of a deal involving teammate Roley Williams.

He quickly established himself in the Northampton first team, going on to make over 200 appearances for the club and was part of the side that gained promotion to Division Three in the 1960–61 season. He decided to leave the club at the end of the season in order to secure more job security for his family, moving to Wisbech.

After retirement

Gale later moved to Australia, before returning to Wales where he ran a hotel. He died on 27 October 2008 at the age of 76.

References

1932 births
2008 deaths
Footballers from Pontypridd
Welsh footballers
Cardiff City F.C. players
Northampton Town F.C. players
English Football League players
Association football defenders